Gayane or Gayaneh is an Armenian female name, which may refer to:

 Gayane (given name), a given name
 Saint Gayane, a 4th-century abbess and martyr of the Armenian Apostolic Church
 Saint Gayane Church, an Armenian Apostolic church in Etchmiadzin
 Gayane (ballet), a 1942 ballet by Aram Khachaturian